Thomas John Lancefield (born 8 October 1990) is an English former cricketer who played as a left-handed batsman and occasional left-arm medium pace bowler. He was born in Epsom, Surrey.

Lancefield made his debut for Surrey in a List A match against Leicestershire at Grace Road in the 2009 Pro40. The following season he made his first-class debut against the touring Bangladeshis. In the following match he made his County Championship debut against Northamptonshire. In total he played 8 first-class matches during the 2010 season, scoring his maiden half century in the process.

It was in the 2010 season that he made his debut in Twenty20 cricket for Surrey against Somerset. He played four further Twenty20 matches in that season's Friends Provident t20.

On 3 May 2014 Glamorgan signed Lancefield on a one-year contract, but was released at the end of the season.

References

External links

1990 births
Living people
Cricketers from Epsom
English cricketers
Glamorgan cricketers
People educated at Whitgift School
Surrey cricketers
Tamil Union Cricket and Athletic Club cricketers
Unicorns cricketers